Madis Müller (born 20 January 1977 in Tallinn) is an Estonian banker. Since 2019, he is the chairman of the Bank of Estonia.

Career
A former government and World Bank advisor, Müller served as the deputy chairman of the Bank of Estonia from 2011 to 2019. In this capacity, he was responsible for the implementation of monetary policy decisions and for managing the central bank’s financial assets.

Other activities
 European Central Bank (ECB), Ex-Officio Member of the Governing Council (since 2019)
 International Monetary Fund (IMF), Ex-Officio Member of the Board of Governors (since 2019)

References

Living people
1977 births
Estonian bankers